Flora E. Douglas (1895–1962) was an American film producer active in the American film industry in the early 1930s. She generally produced westerns or action films. She is also credited as F.E. Douglas.

Selected filmography
 Untamed Justice (1929)
 Beyond the Rio Grande (1930)
 Firebrand Jordan (1930)
 The Phantom of the Desert (1930)
 Canyon Hawks (1930)
 Westward Bound (1930)
 Bar-L Ranch (1930)
 Law of the Rio Grande (1931)
 Hell's Valley (1931)
 Red Fork Range (1931)
 The Mystery Trooper (1931)
 Swanee River (1931)
 Air Police (1931)
 In Old Cheyenne (1931)
 The Lone Trail (1932)

References

Bibliography
 Pitts, Michael R. Poverty Row Studios, 1929–1940: An Illustrated History of 55 Independent Film Companies, with a Filmography for Each. McFarland & Company, 2005.

External links

1895 births
1962 deaths
American film producers
People from Nebraska